Frederick "Rick" Timmo (born 27 July 1947 in Napier, New Zealand) is a former motorcycle speedway rider.

Rick Timmo had his first rides at Napier, where he spent three years before being advised by Colin McKee to try his luck in England. McKee fixed a trial for Timmo at Hackney but promoter Danny Dunton signed him up for Oxford where he stayed for a number of years and became a fans favourite. Barry Briggs, another Kiwi, tried to tempt Timmo to ride for Swindon Robins but he declined.

In the season 1968–69, Timmo toured with the British Lions in New Zealand. His performance made him a NZ favourite and he would go on to ride for his home country against England, Australia and Sweden.

His career was prematurely ended when he had a nasty crash at a grasstrack meeting and broke his femur.

Retiring from speedway he returned home to Napier where he set up a business – Timmo Motorcycles. His son, Spencer, became a speedway rider for Mildenhall Fen Tigers and Newcastle Diamonds, and now races cars in the UK.

External links
 http://www.speedwayplus.com/RickTimmo.shtml
 http://www.speedwayplus.com/NZ7172.shtml
 http://www.internationalspeedway.co.uk/nzveng.htm
 http://www.defunctspeedway.co.uk/Veterans.htm
 http://www.nzherald.co.nz/hawkes-bay-today/news/article.cfm?c_id=1503462&objectid=11023283

1955 births
Sportspeople from Napier, New Zealand
New Zealand motorcycle racers
New Zealand speedway riders
Oxford Cheetahs riders
Living people